John B. Good House is a historic home located at Bowmansville, Brecknock Township in Lancaster County, Pennsylvania. It was built in 1847, and is a -story, sandstone building with a gable roof and full-width front porch.  The house measures 36 feet by 30 feet.  The property includes the remains of demolished outbuildings including a summer kitchen, barn, large drive-in scales, and corn crib.

It was listed on the National Register of Historic Places in 1980.

References 

Houses on the National Register of Historic Places in Pennsylvania
Houses completed in 1847
Houses in Lancaster County, Pennsylvania
1847 establishments in Pennsylvania
National Register of Historic Places in Lancaster County, Pennsylvania